North Carolina Theatre is a professional theatre located in Raleigh, North Carolina.  They perform four mainstage shows each year at Raleigh Memorial Auditorium in the Progress Energy Center for the Performing Arts.  It was founded by De Ann S. Jones and is currently managed by Elizabeth Doran, the executive director of the company. Doran succeeded former CEO, Lisa Grele Barrie, in 2017.

Several Broadway veterans are said to have started their careers at North Carolina Theatre, including Clay Aiken, Sharon Lawrence, Lauren Kennedy, and Beth Leavel.

Alumni
Several notable actors and actresses have taken part in NCT productions:
Clay Aiken as "Clayton Grissom"
Debby Boone
Lisa Brescia
Alan Campbell
Jennifer Cody
Ariana DeBose
Sandy Duncan
Daisy Eagan
Sheena Easton
Larry Gatlin
Deborah Gibson
Montego Glover
Kathy Fitzgerald
Lauren Kennedy
Sharon Lawrence
Beth Leavel
Norm Lewis
Kara Lindsay
Terrence Mann
Andrea McArdle
Julia Murney
Michael Rupert
Elena Shaddow
Sally Struthers
Chuck Wagner
Ira David Wood III
Tom Wopat
Josh Young

References

External links
North Carolina Theatre

Theatre companies in Raleigh, North Carolina
Theatres in Raleigh, North Carolina